The Dennis Gabor Medal and Prize (previously the Duddell Medal and Prize until 2008) is a prize awarded biannually by the Institute of Physics for distinguished contributions to the application of physics in an industrial, commercial or business context. The medal is made of silver and is accompanied by a prize and a certificate.

The original Duddell award was instituted by the Council of The Physical Society in 1923 to the memory of William du Bois Duddell, the inventor of the electromagnetic oscillograph. Between 1961 and 1975 it was awarded in alternate odd-numbered years and thereafter annually.

In 2008 the award was renamed in honour of Dennis Gabor, the Hungarian – British physicist who developed holography, for which he received the 1971 Nobel Prize in Physics. The prize also switched to being awarded in alternate even-numbered years.

Gabor Medallists 
The following have been awarded the Gabor Medal and Prize:

Duddell Medallists 
The following have been awarded the Duddell Medal and Prize:

See also
 Institute of Physics Awards
 List of physics awards
 List of awards named after people

References

External links 
 

Awards established in 1923
1923 establishments in the United Kingdom
Awards of the Institute of Physics